The Brabham BT12 was a mid-engined open-wheel racing car, designed, developed and built by the Brabham team, to compete in the 1964 Indianapolis 500. Jack Brabham managed to qualify the car on the grid in 25th-place, but retired on lap 77 of the race due to a fuel tank damage, from a collision on the first lap.

References

Indianapolis 500
American Championship racing cars
Open wheel racing cars
Brabham racing cars